Rupai may refer to:

Sonai and Rupai, the two daughters of Kandra king Dharma Dev Kanker District Chhattisgarh, India
Sonai Rupai Wildlife Sanctuary protected area located in the state of Assam in India
Rupai Siding a fast developing township situated in the district of Tinsukia in Assam
Rupai (film)